Mohammed Boutaleb (born 1951) is a Moroccan politician and geological engineer who has served as the Minister of Energy and Mining.

Personal life
Mohammed Boutaleb is married and has three children.

References

Government ministers of Morocco
1951 births
Living people